Eduard Gafencu (born February 9, 1993) is a Romanian professional kickboxer and boxer. He currently competes in the Dynamite Fighting Show. Gafencu is the first fighter to become a two-division Colosseum Tournament champion, holding titles in two weight classes simultaneously.  

As of 18 August 2020, he is the #14 ranked welterweight in the world, according to the International Professional Combat Council (IPCC). 

In February 2021, Gafencu signed with Glory.

Early life
Gafencu played soccer from 7 to 14 years old, but quit after an injury. He also practiced swimming. Gafencu then started boxing at the age of 15, but after a short while he switched to kickboxing. At the age of 16 and a half, he had his first fight and practiced kickboxing until the age of 21, culminating in a three-year hiatus.

Professional kickboxing career
Gafencu entered the professional circuit in 2017, after being initiated by the coach Gabriel Moț from Top Fighters Club and taken over from Arnold Nagy (Metalbox) by the Ruben Stoia Boxing Club.

Colosseum Tournament
Gafencu competed for various regional Romanian promotions, in the process amassing a record of 6–0. 

In 2018, Gafencu had signed a contract with the Colosseum Tournament. He took part in a four-man super welterweight tournament to determine the Colosseum Tournament's first Colosseum Tournament World Super Welterweight Champion.

Gafencu faced Adrian Cibu on September 17, 2018, in the semi-final of the Super Welterweight Tournament. He won the fight in emphatic fashion via knockout in round one to progress to the final round of the tournament. Gafencu faced Leonard Dorin's student Adelin Mihăilă at Colosseum Tournament 8 in the finals. Gafencu won the match via knockout in the third round. The triumph also earned Gafencu his first Performance of the Night award.

Gafencu faced Flavius Boiciuc on December 14, 2018, at Colosseum Tournament 10. He won the fight via unanimous decision.

Gafencu faced the Fight Institute by Peter Aerts's Thomas Doeve on 	March 29, 2019, at Colosseum Tournament 11. He won the fight via knockout in round one. This win earned him his second Performance of the Night award. The tornado kick knockout has been also acknowledged by sites like Sherdog, MMA Fighting, MMAjunkie.com and others as the potential Knockout of the Year for 2019.  

Gafencu moved down to the welterweight division. He faced the Bonjasky Academy's Ekrem Doruk for the inaugural Colosseum Tournament World Welterweight Championship on May 9, 2019, in the main event of Colosseum Tournament 12. He won the fight via knockout in the second round, becoming the first Colosseum Tournament fighter to win titles in two weight classes. This win earned him the Performance of the Night award for a third time.

Dynamite Fighting Show
On January 23, 2020, it was announced that Gafencu had signed a deal with Dynamite Fighting Show.

In his debut fight for the promotion, Gafencu faced the Hemmers Gym's Benjamin Masudi on March 5, 2020, at Dynamite Fighting Show 7. Eduard Gafencu knocked down Masudi twice in the fight. He won the fight via unanimous decision.

Return to Colosseum Tournament
In September 2020, it was announced that Gafencu signed a deal to return to the Colosseum Tournament.

In his return bout, Gafencu was expected to face Adelin Mihăilă in rematch on October 23, 2020, at Colosseum Tournament 20. However on October 6, it was announced that Mihăilă pulled out due to his COVID-19 recovery, and he was replaced by Alexandru Ianţoc. Gafencu won the fight via knockout in the second round.

Gafencu faced Anghel Cardoş in a 3-round non-title on February 26, 2021, at Colosseum Tournament 23. He lost the fight via decision.

Fighting style
Gafencu is regarded as one of Romania's best of the new generation of Romanian kickboxers. He earned public praise from Romanian legend Daniel Ghiță for his ring performances. Gafencu was described by Ghiță as "the most talented kickboxer, at present, in the country".

Championships and accomplishments

Kickboxing
Colosseum Tournament
Colosseum Tournament World Welterweight Championship (One, inaugural)
Colosseum Tournament World Super Welterweight Championship (One, inaugural)
Colosseum Tournament World Super Welterweight Championship Tournament Winner
Performance of the Night (Four times) vs. Adrian Cibu & Adelin Mihăilă, Thomas Doeve, Ekrem Doruk and Anghel Cardoş 
First multi-divisional champion in Colosseum Tournament history
Dynamite Fighting Show  
Fight of the Night (One time) vs. Benjamin Masudi
Russia Today
2019 Knockout of the Year vs. Thomas Doeve

Kickboxing record

|-
|-  bgcolor="#CCFFCC"
| 2023-03-12 || Win ||align=left| Mădălin Crăciunică || DFS 18 - Welterweight Championship Tournament, Quarter Finals || Timișoara, Romania || TKO (three knockdowns) || 1 || 2:50 || 17-3
|- 
|-  style="background:#fbb;"
| 2022-08-18 || Loss ||align=left| Alexandru Amariței || Colosseum Tournament 34 || Brașov, Romania || Decision (unanimous) || 5 || 3:00 || 16-3
|-
! style=background:white colspan=9 | 
|-
|-  bgcolor="#CCFFCC"
| 2022-05-09 || Win ||align=left| Robert Gontineac || Colosseum Tournament 31 || Arad, Romania || TKO (towel thrown) || 2 || 1:24 || 16-2
|- 
|-  style="background:#fbb;"
| 2022-04-08 || Loss ||align=left| Joakim Hägg || Colosseum Tournament 30 || Malmö, Sweden || Decision (unanimous) || 3 || 3:00 || 15-2
|- 
|-  bgcolor="#CCFFCC"
| 2021-09-20 || Win ||align=left| Anghel Cardoş || Colosseum Tournament 27 || Oradea, Romania || Decision (unanimous) || 5 || 3:00 || 15-1
|-
! style=background:white colspan=9 | 
|-
|-  bgcolor="#CCFFCC"
| 2021-05-31 || Win ||align=left| Flavius Boiciuc || Colosseum Tournament 25 || Cluj-Napoca, Romania || Decision (unanimous) || 3 || 3:00 || 14-1
|-
|-  style="background:#fbb;"
| 2021-02-26 || Loss ||align=left| Anghel Cardoş || Colosseum Tournament 23 || Bucharest, Romania || Decision (majority) || 3 || 3:00 || 13-1
|-
|-  bgcolor="#CCFFCC"
| 2020-10-23 || Win ||align=left| Alexandru Ianţoc || Colosseum Tournament 20 || Arad, Romania || KO (jumping knee) || 2 || 2:25 || 13-0
|-
|-  bgcolor="#CCFFCC"
| 2020-03-05 || Win ||align=left| Benjamin Masudi || DFS 7 || Arad, Romania || Decision (unanimous) || 3 || 3:00 || 12-0
|- 
|-  bgcolor="#CCFFCC"
| 2019-05-09 || Win ||align=left| Ekrem Doruk || Colosseum Tournament 12 || Arad, Romania || KO (jumping knee and punches) || 2 || 2:13 || 11-0
|-
! style=background:white colspan=9 |
|-
|-  bgcolor="#CCFFCC"
| 2019-03-29 || Win ||align=left| Thomas Doeve || Colosseum Tournament 11 || Bucharest, Romania || KO (tornado kick) || 1 || 2:19 || 10-0
|-
! style=background:white colspan=9 |
|-
|-  bgcolor="#CCFFCC"
| 2018-12-14 || Win ||align=left| Flavius Boiciuc || Colosseum Tournament 10 || Timișoara, Romania || Decision (unanimous) || 3 || 3:00 || 9-0
|- 
|-  bgcolor="#CCFFCC"
| 2018-09-17 || Win ||align=left| Adelin Mihăilă || Colosseum Tournament 8, Final || Bucharest, Romania || KO (right hook & double left hook) || 3 || 0:22 || 8-0 
|-
! style=background:white colspan=9 |
|-
|-  bgcolor="#CCFFCC"
| 2018-09-17 || Win ||align=left| Adrian Cibu || Colosseum Tournament 8, Semi-final || Bucharest, Romania || KO (flurry of punches) || 1 || 2:57 || 7-0 
|-
! style=background:white colspan=9 |
|-
|-  bgcolor="#CCFFCC"
| 2018-01-28 || Win ||align=left| Paul Crețiu || Fighters League 2 || Reșița, Romania || Decision (unanimous) || 3 || 3:00 || 6-0  
|-
|-
| colspan=9 | Legend:

Professional boxing record

See also 
List of male kickboxers

References

External links
 
 Eduard Gafencu at Tapology.com

1993 births
Living people
Sportspeople from Arad, Romania
Romanian male kickboxers
Light heavyweight kickboxers
Glory kickboxers
Romanian male boxers
Super-middleweight boxers
Eastern Orthodox Christians from Romania